Julia or Julie Walker may refer to:

Julia Walker (climate scientist) (born 1950), English meteorologist
Julie White Walker, American state librarian of Georgia
Julie Ann Walker, American romantic suspense novelist

Characters
Julia Walker (Brothers & Sisters), television character played by Sarah Jane Morris
Dr. Julia Walker, played by Kyra Zagorsky on the 2014 television series Helix